.
Boo Islands are a small group of islands in the westernmost part of Raja Ampat, Southwest Papua, Indonesia. The main island is Boo Besar, others include Boo Kecil. The Boo Islands area includes the Kofiau-Boo Islands Marine Protected Area.

References 

Archipelagoes of Indonesia
Uninhabited islands of Indonesia